The Suceava ( Suchava) is a river located in the north-east of Romania (Suceava County) and western Ukraine (Chernivtsi Oblast). It is a right tributary of the river Siret. It discharges into the Siret in the town Liteni, 21 km south-east of the city of Suceava.

It rises from the Obcina Mestecăniș Mountains in Bukovina, near the border with Ukraine.

Towns and villages

The following towns and villages are situated along the river Suceava, from source to mouth: Izvoarele Sucevei, Shepit, Seliatyn, Ulma, Brodina, Vicovu de Jos, Bilca, Dornești, Satu Mare, Suceava, Verești.

Tributaries

The following rivers are tributaries to the river Suceava (from source to mouth):

Left: Aluniș, Izvor, Cobilioara, Garbanevski, Melesh, Rapochev, Rusca, Ulma, Sadău, Falcău, Caraula, Șicova, Bilca Mare, Petrimiasa, Târnauca, Climăuț, Ruda, Horaiț, Hatnuța, Pătrăuțeanca, Dragomirna, Mitoc, Podul Vătafului, Plopeni, Salcea

Right: Pogonișoara, Nisipitu, Brodina, Pârâul Ascuns, Valea Boului, Putna, Vicov, Remezeu, Voitinel, Pozen, Sucevița, Solca, Soloneț, Ilișești, Șcheia, Râul Târgului, Udești, Racova

References

Rivers of Romania
 
Rivers of Suceava County
Rivers of Chernivtsi Oblast